Linwood is a city in Leavenworth County, Kansas, United States, and part of the Kansas City metropolitan area.  As of the 2020 census, the population of the city was 415.  It is located along K-32 highway between Lawrence and Bonner Springs.

History

Beginnings
Linwood was founded as Journeycake, being named after Charles Journeycake, the last Delaware chief.  (Sometimes people made fun of the name Journeycake by calling it "Johnny Cake".)  The community was platted on both sides of Stranger Creek, near its mouth at the Kansas River.

After the treaty's signature, each member of the tribe was assigned a parcel of land, and the balance of the tribe's territories were sold to the predecessor of the Union Pacific Railroad. Meanwhile, the U.S. government established a trading post near Stranger Creek until the tribe was moved to the Indian Territory in 1867. Located beside the Union Pacific Railroad tracks, the store became the first school in the community.

Union Pacific Railroad
In September 1863, the Union Pacific Railroad began building the main line westward across the Great Plains from Kansas City, Kansas, to Denver, Colorado. This was the long-line railroad in Kansas for 2–3 years.  The first  was open in 1864 from Wyandotte (now a suburb of Kansas City) to Lawrence. William A. Harris moved to Kansas in 1865 employed as a civil engineer for the Union Pacific Railroad. In 1868 it became the Kansas Pacific Railroad because it was easier to refer to.

Name change
The original community of Journeycake was officially platted as Stranger on July 11, 1867, and recorded at the Leavenworth County Courthouse. When the name Stranger became a problem for the Postal Service who confused Stranger with a nearby community also named Stranger (referred to as "Big" Stranger), it was renamed Linwood on December 20, 1877.  Legend has it that one day when the citizens were cutting wood for the church, Colonel Loring suggested they change the name to Linwood, because of the many linden trees that grew in the area.  But, according to the Kansas Historical Collections, the community of Stranger had its name changed to Linwood by Senator William A. Harris because of his great appreciation for the linwood trees that were abundant in the vicinity of Stranger Creek.

Senator Harris
William A. Harris moved to Kansas in 1865 employed as a civil engineer for the Union Pacific Railroad until 1868, when he moved to Lawrence, Kansas. He was appointed agent for the railroad companies in the sale of the Delaware Reservation and other lands.  In 1884 Harris became a prominent citizen of Linwood, where he engaged in agricultural pursuits and stock raising.  He bought several  of land just west of Linwood that bordered the city.  On a high hill within sight of city he built a modest two story mansion with fifteen rooms, the Harris House. Harris was elected as a Democratic Congressman to the Fifty-third Congress (1893–1895) and as a Populist to the U.S. Senate (1897–1903). He was an unsuccessful candidate for Governor of Kansas in 1906. Harris died in 1909, and is buried in Lawrence, Kansas.

Relocation
Much of Linwood's commerce came from the saw mills on the river, so the city had grown very near the banks of the Kansas River (affectionately known as the “Kaw” River) that flows eastward to the Missouri.  After the 1903 flood damaged and endangered much of the city, it was relocated about one mile (1.6 km) north to its present location out of “the bottoms” (as they are still known today) near the river.

21st century

Currently the city has less than 400 people. In just the last couple of years numerous new homes have been built drawing new families. Linwood has several businesses including a gas station, tavern, landscaping company, salsa plant and a Dollar General retail store. Linwood is home to one of the Basehor-Linwood Elementary Schools, while the Basehor-Linwood Middle and High Schools are located in Basehor.

2019 tornado

On May 28, 2019, an EF4 tornado with Doppler windspeed measurements of over 187 mph struck the outlying areas of the city and severely damaged homes.  At least 13 injuries have been reported due to the storm.  The city itself was spared any major damage with just the occasional roof damage and loss of trees and fencing.

Geography
Linwood is located at  (39.000722, -95.037199). Linwood is situated along the north bank of the Kansas River.

Demographics

2010 census
As of the census of 2010, there were 375 people, 139 households, and 92 families residing in the city. The racial makeup of the city was 92.5% White, 0.3% Native American, 0.3% Asian, 4.0% from other races, and 2.9% from two or more races. Hispanic or Latino of any race were 6.9% of the population.

There were 139 households, of which 37.4% had children under the age of 18 living with them, 42.4% were married couples living together, 10.8% had a female householder with no husband present, 12.9% had a male householder with no wife present, and 33.8% were non-families. 25.9% of all households were made up of individuals, and 8.7% had someone living alone who was 65 years of age or older. The average household size was 2.70 and the average family size was 3.14.

The median age in the city was 31.8 years. 27.2% of residents were under the age of 18; 12.8% were between the ages of 18 and 24; 30.9% were from 25 to 44; 21% were from 45 to 64; and 8% were 65 years of age or older. The gender makeup of the city was 53.3% male and 46.7% female.

2000 census
As of the census of 2000, there were 374 people, 129 households, and 87 families residing in the city. The racial makeup of the city was 90% White, 1% African American, 4% from other races, and 5% from two or more races. Hispanic or Latino of any race were 8% of the population.

There were 129 households, out of which 45% had children under the age of 18 living with them, 47% were married couples living together, 14% had a female householder with no husband present, and 32% were non-families. 26% of all households were made up of individuals, and 9% had someone living alone who was 65 years of age or older. The average household size was 2.9 and the average family size was 3.5.

In the city, the population was spread out, with 35% under the age of 18, 13% from 18 to 24, 30% from 25 to 44, 17% from 45 to 64, and 5% who were 65 years of age or older. The median age was 27 years. For every 100 females, there were 92.8 males. For every 100 females age 18 and over, there were 93.6 males.

The median income for a household in the city was $35,313, and the median income for a family was $39,125. Males had a median income of $26,875 versus $24,896 for females. The per capita income for the city was $13,008. About 6.1% of families and 7.2% of the population were below the poverty line, including 9.5% of those under age 18 and none of those age 65 or over.

Notable people
 William Harris (1841-1909), Kansas senator
 Charles Journeycake (1817-1894), founder of Linwood

See also
 March 2006 tornado outbreak sequence
 List of United States tornadoes in April 2009
 List of United States tornadoes in May 2019

References

Further reading

External links
 City of Linwood
 Linwood - Directory of Public Officials
 Linwood Library
 Pictures of Linwood, Kansas
 Linwood city map, KDOT

Cities in Kansas
Cities in Leavenworth County, Kansas
Populated places established in 1860